Jill Harrison (née Clarke; born 20 June 1958) is an English long-distance runner. She is the 1980 World University Cross Country Champion. At the age of 55 in 2013, she won the 5000 metres and 10,000 metres at the World Masters Athletics Championships.

Career
Clarke Harrison grew up in a small village in Derbyshire. She didn't discover running until encouraged in a PE lesson to train for the Sheffield schools championships.  This lead her to run for Britain at the age of 19. By this time she had already been 2nd in the English Schools. She studied at the Birmingham and Loughborough Universities and turned down a scholarship to an American University. She became World Student Champion in cross country in 1998.

Clarke represented England competing in the 10,000 metres at the 1986 Commonwealth Games in Edinburgh, Scotland, but dropped out due to injury. She ran 2:34:19 to finish 14th at the 1989 London Marathon.

Coaches have included George Gandy, Brian Scoby and Frank Horwill. Training partners have included 1989 London Marathon winner Veronique Marot, 1984 Olympic silver medallist Wendy Sly, and Angie Pain. She won at the 2013 World Masters Championships, running 19:29 in the 5000m and 42:25 in the 10,000m.

Harrison now lives in the West Country with her husband and two children.

Personal bests
All-time rankings as of June 2017
5000 metres - 15:34.16 in 1985  (45th on UK all-time list)
10 km (road) - 32:41 in 1987 (36th on UK all-time list)
Half-marathon - 71:44 in 1987 (26th on UK all-time list)
Marathon - 2:34:19 in 1989 (46th on UK-all-time list)

Events
World University Cross Country Championships Women (individual) Gold Medal Jill Clarke/Harrison 1980 
Vulcan Run-1987 November 3 place Jill Clarke/Harrison in 33´32´´ 
10,000 meters 33´27´´ 1st place Hull 22-jun-1986
10 kilometers (road) 32´41´´ 4th place Orlando, Florida USA 21-feb-1987
15 kilometers (road) 50´27´´ 2nd place Jacksonville, Florida USA 14-mar-1987
10 miles (road) 54´27´´ 4th place Washington DC. USA 2-abril-1989
Half marathon 1º11´44´´ 1st place Fleet 29-mar-1987
25 kilometers (road) 1º30´33´´ 2nd place Glasgow 30-sep-1990
Marathon 2º34´19´´ 14th place London Marathon 23-April-1989 toda esta información está en (http://www.gbrathletics.com/uk/wc99.htm)

References

External links

gbrathletics

1958 births
Living people
Sportspeople from Sheffield
English female long-distance runners
Alumni of the University of Birmingham
Alumni of Loughborough University
British female long-distance runners